Scott Horta (born October 3, 1988 in Princeton, New Jersey, United States) is an American-born Puerto Rican footballer.

Career 
Horta grew up in New Jersey and attended Notre Dame High School there, playing soccer on the high school team for four years. At Notre Dame High School, he was a three-year letter winner and was named to the first team All-State by the Coaches Association of New Jersey. After graduating high school, he attended Towson University and played for the Towson Tigers men soccer team. He began to play for the Puerto Rico National Team during his freshman year of college. After graduating from Towson, Horta joined the New Jersey-based Pipeline S.C.

International 
Between 2008 and 2011, Horta played for the Puerto Rico National Team in eight games.

He has been capped twice, starting both FIFA 2010 World Cup Qualifiers against Honduras.

Personal life 
Horta is married to former UMBC women's soccer player Sarah Purdum. The two live together in Maryland.

References

1988 births
Living people
Notre Dame High School (New Jersey) alumni
Puerto Rican footballers
Puerto Rico international footballers
Towson Tigers men's soccer players
Association football defenders
Soccer players from New Jersey
People from Princeton, New Jersey
Sportspeople from Mercer County, New Jersey